The Christchurch Catholic Cathedral is the planned replacement to the Cathedral of the Blessed Sacrament which was damaged in the 2010 and 2011 Canterbury earthquakes and later demolished. This makes the cathedral the future mother church of the Roman Catholic Diocese of Christchurch. It will be located adjacent Victoria Square in the city centre of Christchurch, New Zealand. The cathedral is expected to be completed by 2025. The plans were announced by Bishop Paul Martin on 7 December 2019.

Building collaboration 
The cathedral is a part of a $500m collaboration called North of the Square, partnered with the Catholic Diocese of Christchurch, Ōtākaro Limited, and the Carter Group. This development includes new offices, a five-star hotel and a multi-storey carpark. St Mary's Primary School will also be relocated to the new development.

Costs 
The Catholic precinct will cost $100m, with $40m being designated to the construction of the cathedral. The remaining funds will be spent on chancery offices, an open courtyard, a garden and parking.

Design 
Two architect companies that are to design the new cathedral are local architect firm, Warren and Mahoney Architects, based in Christchurch and Franck & Lohsen Architects from the United States. Franck & Lohsen are known to focus on designing traditional design and have built churches all over the world. Bishop Martin is stated saying why this firm was chosen:“I am looking for us to build something that is more traditional rather than something modern. It needs to tap into why people loved the [cathedral]. People loved the [cathedral] because of the style and elegance.”

Funding 
Of the $500m collaboration, $126m will be set aside for the diocese. Funding for the construction of the cathedral will be carried out, with $45m already being used from its earthquake fund, as well as selling land no longer needed by the diocese.

References 

Roman Catholic cathedrals in New Zealand
Churches in Christchurch
Christchurch Central City
Proposed religious places